The Mall at University Town Center is a shopping mall located in Sarasota County, Florida just south of the Manatee County line near the community of Lakewood Ranch. It opened on October 16, 2014 and is anchored by Saks Fifth Avenue, Macy's, Apple and Dillard's.

History 
The Mall at University Town Center began in 2002 when Benderson Corporation purchased the land and announced their intention to build the land into a regional mall. In 2007, Nordstrom signed a letter of intent to open at the mall. Neiman Marcus and Macy's signed letters of intent soon after, with a planned groundbreaking in 2008 and a planned opening in 2010. The Taubman Corp. joined the project in May 2008, a 50/50 split with Benderson. In summer of 2009, the project was placed on hold due to the Great Recession, and the three planned anchor stores pulled out.

On October 15, 2012, a revamped Mall at University Town Center was unveiled. Macy's rejoined the project, this time joined by Dillard's and Saks Fifth Avenue. Groundbreaking would occur on October 15, 2012. The Mall would officially open on October 16, 2014. At the time of its opening it was the first regional shopping center built in Sarasota in 35 years and was one of two enclosed malls that opened in the United States during 2014.

During the COVID-19 pandemic the mall would close starting on March 19, 2020 and ended up reopening on May 6.

The District at UTC 
The District East and The District West are two shopping centers located just east and west of the Mall at UTC. The District West includes retailers such as Super Target, Old Navy, Best Buy, Ulta Beauty, Petco, Dick's Sporting Goods and Bed Bath & Beyond . The District East is slated to include shopping, hotels, a movie theater and housing. Bordering Nathan Benderson Park, home of the 2017 World Rowing Championships. The District East is currently under development.

References

External links
 

Shopping malls in Florida
Shopping malls established in 2014
Taubman Centers
Buildings and structures in Sarasota, Florida
Tourist attractions in Sarasota County, Florida
2014 establishments in Florida